Adas Juškevičius (born 3 January 1989) is a Lithuanian professional basketball player for BC Wolves of the Lithuanian Basketball League.

Professional career

Tecnyconta Zaragoza (2016–2017)
On 9 November 2016, Juškevičius signed with Tecnyconta Zaragoza of Liga ACB.

Lietkabelis Panevėžys (2017–2018)
On 23 July 2017, Juškevičius signed  a one-year deal with Lietkabelis Panevėžys. On 19 January 2018, he parted ways with Lietkabelis in order to sign in Turkey.

Galatasaray (2018)
On 24 January 2018, he signed with Turkish club Galatasaray until the end of the 2018–19 season.

Nanterre 92 (2018–2019)
On 3 August 2018, Juškevičius joined Nanterre 92 of the French LNB Pro A.

Parma Basket (2019–2022)
On August 2, 2019, Juškevičius signed with Parma of the VTB United League. Juškevičius was selected to the 2020 VTB United League All-Star Game where he scored 12 points, grabbed 3 rebounds, dished out 1 assist and made 4 steals.

Vanoli Cremona (2022)
On March 6, 2022, Juškevičius signed with Vanoli Cremona of the Italian Lega Basket Serie A.

BC Wolves (2022–present)
On July 6, 2022, he has signed with BC Wolves of the Lithuanian Basketball League.

National team career
Juškevičius was on Lithuania national basketball team candidates list before EuroBasket 2013, but haven't made into the final roster. In 2014 coach Jonas Kazlauskas included Juškevičius into preliminary 24 players list for main Lithuania squad as well. Following Mantas Kalnietis injury, Juškevičius qualified into the main roster and represented Lithuania in 2014 FIBA Basketball World Cup. He also was included into the national team's candidates list in 2015, but was released on August 25.

References

External links
 Adas Juškevičius at euroleague.net
 Adas Juškevičius at fiba.com
 

1989 births
Living people
2014 FIBA Basketball World Cup players
Basket Zaragoza players
Basketball players at the 2016 Summer Olympics
Basketball players from Kaunas
BC Lietkabelis players
BC Prienai players
BC Rytas players
BC Wolves players
BC Žalgiris players
BC Žalgiris-2 players
Eisbären Bremerhaven players
Galatasaray S.K. (men's basketball) players
Liga ACB players
Lithuanian expatriate basketball people in France
Lithuanian expatriate basketball people in Germany
Lithuanian expatriate basketball people in Spain
Lithuanian expatriate basketball people in Turkey
Lithuanian men's basketball players
LSU-Atletas basketball players
Nanterre 92 players
Olympic basketball players of Lithuania
Parma Basket players
Point guards
Shooting guards